Viola guestphalica, common name high calamine pansy, Westphalia pansy, zinc pansy or (in German) Blaues Galmeiveilchen, is native to the region of northwestern Germany known as Westphalia. It is found in the wild only in the Districts of Paderborn, Hoexter and Hochsauerlandkreis, although it is cultivated in other locations. These are industrial areas where much of the soil is contaminated with lead, zinc and other metals, which some Viola species are more able to tolerate than some other plants.

Viola guestphalica is in many ways similar to the yellow-flowered V. calaminaria, and long treated as a variety of that species. Recent studies, however, suggest that it should be treated as a separate species.

Viola guestphalica is an herb up to 15 cm (6 inches) tall. Flowers are blue-violet with darker blue streaks toward the center, and prominent yellow anthers.

References

External links

guestphalica
Flora of Germany